SIA Scotch Whisky (pronounced "see-a") is a brand of Scotch whisky. It is a blend of Speyside, Highland and Islay malt and grain whiskies. The brand was created by its founder Carin Luna-Ostaseski with help from a Kickstarter funding campaign.

Awards and ratings 

 Double Gold, 2014 San Francisco World Spirits Competition
 91 points, Wine Enthusiast Magazine
 90 points, Whisky Advocate Magazine
 96 points, 2016 Ultimate Spirits Challenge

External links 
 Official website

References 

Blended Scotch whisky
Kickstarter-funded products